Federation Peak is a Tasmanian mountain with a sharp spire-like shape, which marks the southern end of the Eastern Arthur Range in the Southwest National Park.

Its reputation is such that Sir Edmund Hillary declared it "Australia's only real mountain".

History

The first westerner to sight the peak was the surveyor James Sprent who was carrying out a trigonometrical survey of Tasmania. He described it as "the Obelisk". It became known as Sprent's Obelisk, however in 1901 it was officially named Federation Peak in honour of the Federation of Australia by Thomas Bather Moore while cutting a track from Hastings to Port Davey via Old River.

It took almost 50 years after the first western sighting for the summit to be reached, a testament to the harshness of southwest Tasmania. Challenges include thick horizontal scrub, ancient cool temperate rainforest, exceptionally steep and harsh terrain on the surrounding ridges and highly unpredictable weather generated by the roaring forties.

After several unsuccessful attempts by various groups in the late 1940s, a party from the Geelong College Exploration Society led by John Béchervaise reached the summit on the 27 January 1949.

The exposed and technical nature of the usual route that is usually climbed unroped has resulted in a number of fatalities; most recently on 23 March 2016 when a bushwalker fell to her death.

Climate

The highest elevations of the mountain experience alpine conditions with most of the weather patterns determined by the wind. The mountain receives large amounts of snow in autumn, winter and early spring, with the summit area frequently layered in ice. Unseasonal snowfalls can be seen in summer though many of them don't settle.

Climbing routes

There are a number of graded rockclimbing routes to the summit, most notably Blade Ridge (grade 18), which is a steep knife edge ridge rising out of the cool temperate forest at the foot of the mountain. The ridge joins the main face of the peak a few hundred metres beneath the summit. Blade Ridge was first successfully used as a route up Federation Peak in February 1968, by Peter Heddles, Rod Harris, David Neilson and Jack Woods

Most bushwalkers with minimal or no climbing gear take the exposed 'Direct Ascent' scramble from the Southern Traverse of the peak above a drop of  into Lake Geeves (approximate sport climbing grade 5/Australian climbing grade 15).

Access to the base of the peak is generally from Geeveston via Farmhouse Creek and Moss Ridge or Scotts Peak via the Eastern Arthurs. The first route is the shorter of two - generally three days to the peak. The Eastern Arthurs via Scotts Peak Dam takes at least 7 days finishing at Farmhouse Creek; up to 10 days with bad weather.

Winter ascents 

The first ascent under true winter conditions was made by Faye Kerr and Max Cutcliffe in September 1954, while a Tasmanian group led by Kevin Doran climbed the Mountain in severe weather over two weeks in August 1978, a trip which cost Doran a toe from cold injuries.

The first, and only, winter ascent of Blade Ridge (a steep sharp ridge on the northern face) was made in 2016 by Mick Wright and Mark Savage, on an expedition led by Andy Szollosi. Their journey is featured in the documentary Winter on the Blade.

See also

List of highest mountains of Tasmania

References 

http://www.thesarvo.com/confluence/display/thesarvo/Federation+Peak

External links
Federation Peak - John Chapman

Mountains of Tasmania
South West Tasmania